This article details longest squash match records by duration.

Overall

Men

2 h 50 Holtrand Gas City Pro-Am 2015, semifinal:
 Leo Au def.  Shawn Delierre, 11–6, 4–11, 11–6, 7–11, 16–14 (170 min).
2 h 46 Chichester Festival 1983, final:
 Jahangir Khan def.  Gamal Awad, 9–10, 9–5, 9–7, 9–2 (166 min).
2 h 37 National Capital Open 2013, final:
 Shawn Delierre def.  Adrian Waller, 11–13, 12–10, 14–12, 4–11, 14–12  (157 min).
2 h 30 Baltimore Cup 2008, semifinal:
 Shawn Delierre def.  Shahier Razik, 9–11, 8–11, 11–7, 13–11, 11–5  (150 min).
2 h 26 Hong Kong Open 2006, 2nd round:
 Grégory Gaultier def.  Adrian Grant, 12–10, 11–3, 3–11, 7–11, 13–11 (146 min).

See also
Squash
PSA World Tour

References

External links
Leo Au Sets Record For Longest Ever Match Then Wins Title
The longest match ever
European Squash Federation - Italian Open Masters 2019 - matches

Squash records and statistics